Korond Rural District is in the Central District of Boshruyeh County, South Khorasan province, Iran. At the National Census of 2006, its constituent villages were in the former Boshruyeh District of Ferdows County. The rural district was created in 2008. There were 754 inhabitants in 253 households at the following census of 2011, by which time the district had been separated from the county and Boshruyeh County established. At the most recent census of 2016, the population of the rural district was 902 in 309 households. The largest of its 31 villages was Korond, with 593 people.

References 

Boshruyeh County

Rural Districts of South Khorasan Province

Populated places in South Khorasan Province

Populated places in Boshruyeh County